The Thai Ambassador in Rome is the official representative of the Government in Bangkok to the Government of Italy and concurrently to the governments in Athens (Greece), Jerusalem (Israel), Nicosia (Cyprus), San Marino, Tirana (Albania) and the Order of Malta.

List of representatives

 Italy–Thailand relations

References 

Italy
Thailand
Ambassadors